Paola "Paoletta" Magoni (married name Sforza, born 14 September 1964) is an Italian former alpine skier.

Career
At the 1984 Winter Olympics in Sarajevo, she won the slalom event in front of Perrine Pelen and Ursula Konzett. She also won a bronze medal in slalom at the Alpine World Ski Championships 1985 in Bormio.

World Cup victories

References

External links
 

1964 births
Living people
Sportspeople from the Province of Bergamo
Italian female alpine skiers
Olympic alpine skiers of Italy
Alpine skiers at the 1984 Winter Olympics
Alpine skiers at the 1988 Winter Olympics
Olympic gold medalists for Italy
Olympic medalists in alpine skiing
Medalists at the 1984 Winter Olympics